Shyam Singh Yadav (born 31 March 1954) is an Indian politician and a Member of Parliament in the 17th Lok Sabha from Jaunpur, Uttar Pradesh. He is a member of Bahujan Samaj Party (BSP) and the leader of the party in the Lok Sabha. He is the chairperson of the Parliamentary Committee on Papers laid on the Table since 2019. He is also the member of Parliamentary Standing Committee on Coal and Steel; Parliamentary Joint Committee on Offices of Profit; member of Parliamentary General Purposes Committee (Lok Sabha); and member of Parliamentary Consultative Committee of the Ministry of Petroleum and Natural Gas. He is also a former PCS officer.

Yadav has represented India in international shooting events and has also coached the Indian shooting team at the Beijing Olympic Games 2008 and Melbourne Commonwealth Games 2006.

Personal life
Yadav was born on 31 March 1954 to father Uma Shankar Singh Yadav and mother Indrawati Yadav in Jaunpur, Uttar Pradesh. He achieved his Bachelor of Science, Master of Science (1976) and LLB (1979) degrees from Allahabad University. He married Pushpa Yadav on 11 March 1986, with whom he has a son and a daughter. He is an advocate and agriculturalist by profession. He lives in Ranipatti village in Mariahu.

Career
Yadav held various posts as a civil servant.

As a former civil servant, Yadav has worked in various capacities, including sub-divisional magistrate, municipal commissioner, special secretary and vice-chairman of different development authorities.

Yadav is also an ace shooter. He has participated in a number of shooting competitions at both national and international level. He was the Indian coach of rifle shooting and has also coached Rajyavardhan Singh Rathore. He coached the Indian shooting team at the Beijing Olympic Games 2008 and Melbourne Commonwealth Games 2006. Yadav is the President of Uttar Pradesh State Rifle Association and the Vice President of Uttar Pradesh Olympic Association. He has also been the Treasurer of the National Rifle Association of India (NRAI). Was a member of Advisory Board of Censor Board in Mumbai from 2016-2019.

Awards and achievements 
 Laxman Awardee U.P. Government 2000

References

External links
Official biographical sketch in Parliament of India website

|-

|-

1954 births
Living people
India MPs 2019–present
Lok Sabha members from Uttar Pradesh
Bahujan Samaj Party politicians
People from Jaunpur, Uttar Pradesh
University of Allahabad alumni